Starokhalilovo (İśke Xälil) is a rural locality (a selo) in Mesyagutovsky Selsoviet Duvansky District, Bashkortostan, Russia. The population was 378 as of 2010. There are 10 streets.

Geography 
Starokhalilovo is located 10 km northeast of Mesyagutovo (the district's administrative centre) by road. Mesyagutovo is the nearest rural locality.

References 

Rural localities in Duvansky District